Boy Friend is a 1975 Indian Malayalam film, directed and produced by P. Venu. The film stars Vincent, Rani Chandra, Pattom Sadan and Sudheer in the lead roles. The film has musical score by G. Devarajan.

Cast
 
K. P. Ummer
Vidhubala 
Sudheer
Vincent
Rani Chandra 
Ravi Menon 
Sukumari 
Adoor Bhasi 
Pattom Sadan 
Peethambaran
Sreelatha Namboothiri 
Surendran
Girijan 
Jameela Malik  
Kuthiravattam Pappu 
Lissy
Mallika Sukumaran 
Reena 
S. P. Pillai 
Sadasivan 
Sadhana  
Swapna
Thankappan

Soundtrack
The music was composed by G. Devarajan.

References

External links
 

1975 films
1970s Malayalam-language films